Fauquier may refer to:

People
 Francis Fauquier (1703-1768), lieutenant governor of Virginia Colony
 Frederick Fauquier (1817-1881), Canadian Angelican priest
 George Fauquier (1798-1887), English cricketer
 John Emilius Fauquier (1909-1981), Canadian aviator and Second World War Bomber Command leader

Places

Canada
 Fauquier, British Columbia, Canada
 Fauquier-Strickland, Ontario, Canada

United States
 Fauquier County, Virginia, United States
 Fauquier County Public Schools
 Fauquier High School
 Fauquier County Sheriff's Office
 Old Fauquier County Jail
 Warrenton-Fauquier Airport